Calcarovula is a genus of sea snails, marine gastropod mollusks in the family Ovulidae.

Species
Species within the genus Calcarovula include:

Calcarovula arthritica Lorenz & Fehse, 2009
Calcarovula gracillima (E. A. Smith, 1901)
Calcarovula ildiko Lorenz, 2006
Calcarovula longirostrata (Sowerby, 1828)
Calcarovula mikado (Kurohara & Habe, 1991)
Calcarovula piragua (Dall, 1889)
Species brought into synonymy
 Calcarovula virgo Azuma, 1974: synonym of Calcarovula longirostrata (G.B. Sowerby I, 1828)

References

External links
 Cate C.N. (1973). A systematic revision of the recent cypraeid family Ovulidae. The Veliger. 15 (supplement): 1-117

Ovulidae
Gastropod genera